Christopher Smith Cross (26 October 1852 – 26 June 1919) was a New Zealand cricketer and businessman who played first-class cricket in New Zealand from 1874 to 1895.

Cross was born in Nelson, where his father, James Smith Cross, was the harbourmaster. He married Anne Green in Nelson in May 1876.

Cross was a hard-hitting batsman, a fast-medium bowler, a fine fieldsman and sometimes wicket-keeper. He made his highest first-class score for Wellington when they defeated Otago in 1892–93; he scored 67, easily the highest score of the match, an innings of "sterling cricket, comprising excellent cutting and driving". He captained the Wanganui team that inflicted the only defeat on the touring Australians in 1880-81. In 1882, while batting at the St John's ground in Wanganui, Cross hit a ball that travelled 156 yards before it landed. This hit was still a New Zealand record in the late 1950s, and may still be.

He worked as a financial agent and merchant. Later he moved to Australia, where he had a business in Sydney as a coal exporter and shipping agent. He died in Sydney after a long illness, leaving a widow, three sons and two daughters.

References

External links
 
 

1852 births
1919 deaths
New Zealand businesspeople
New Zealand cricketers
Nelson cricketers
Wellington cricketers
Cricketers from Nelson, New Zealand
North Island cricketers
West Coast cricketers